Emma Kate Marlow (born 12 April 2004) is an English cricketer who currently plays for Yorkshire, Northern Diamonds and Trent Rockets. She plays as a right-arm off break bowler.

Early life
Marlow was born on 12 April 2004 in Harrogate.

Domestic career
Marlow first played for Yorkshire in 2020, in friendlies arranged when the county season was cancelled due to the COVID-19 pandemic. She made her full county debut for Yorkshire in the 2021 Women's Twenty20 Cup, against Cumbria. She played three matches for the side in the 2022 Women's Twenty20 Cup, taking two wickets at an average of 27.50.

Marlow was named in the Northern Diamonds Academy squad for the 2021 season. She was promoted to the first team squad ahead of the 2022 season. She made her debut for the side on 14 May 2022, against Lightning in the Charlotte Edwards Cup, where she took 2/12 from her 4 overs. She went on to play 11 matches for Northern Diamonds in 2022, across the Charlotte Edwards Cup and the Rachael Heyhoe Flint Trophy, taking seven wickets apiece in each competition. She was also part of the Trent Rockets squad in The Hundred, but did not play a match. At the end of the 2022 season, it was announced that Marlow had signed her first professional contract with Northern Diamonds.

International career
In October 2022, Marlow was selected in the England Under-19 squad for the 2023 ICC Under-19 Women's T20 World Cup. She went on to play two matches in the tournament.

References

External links

2004 births
Living people
Cricketers from Harrogate
Yorkshire women cricketers
Northern Diamonds cricketers